Jalizi-ye Abdolreza (also Romanized as Jalīzī-ye ʿAbdolrez̤ā) is a village in Allah-o Akbar Rural District, in the Central District of Dasht-e Azadegan County, Khuzestan Province, Iran. At the 2006 census, its population was 1,432, in 263 families.

References 

Populated places in Dasht-e Azadegan County